Kintla Peak is a pyramidal peak in the Livingston Range of Glacier National Park in the U.S. state of Montana. It is the tallest mountain in the Livingston Range and the third-tallest in the park. It is also the most northerly peak and land area in the contiguous United States above . The Agassiz Glacier lies below it to the southeast.

Kintla Peak consists of ancient Precambrian (Mesoproterozoic) rock strata that are part of the Belt Supergroup. It is named after the Kintla Lakes, and the word "Kintla" originates from the Kootenai word for "sack". Kootenai legend states that a man had apparently drowned in one of the lakes and likened the lake to a sack where "once you got in, you couldn't get out".

Kintla Peak lies the remote northwest corner of the park and a hike of almost  from the nearest road is required just to reach the base of the mountain. The peak is notable for its large rise above local terrain; the elevation of nearby Upper Kintla Lake is only . (Kintla Peak's northern neighbor Kinnerly Peak has an even more dramatic drop to Upper Kintla Lake.) This helps make Kintla "the most arduous climb in the northwest section of the park". The standard route is the Southeast Ridge Route, from the Agassiz Glacier basin. This route has a long approach and a large total vertical gain, and involves rock scrambling up to Class 4, in addition to some climbing on snow, depending on the season. Other routes include the East Ridge, West Face, and Upper North Face routes.

See also
 List of mountains and mountain ranges of Glacier National Park (U.S.)

References

External links

 Kintla Peak at summitpost

Mountains of Flathead County, Montana
Mountains of Glacier National Park (U.S.)
Mountains of Montana